Lomatium lucidum is a species of flowering plant in the carrot family known by the common name shiny biscuitroot. It is native to coastal mountains and canyons of southern California and Baja California, where it is a member of the chaparral plant community, including recently burned areas. It is found in the eastern Transverse Ranges and the South Coast region.

Description
Lomatium lucidum is a somewhat fleshy perennial herb sometimes exceeding a meter tall. The leaves are up to about 24 centimeters long and are divided into many toothed, three-lobed leaflets each a few centimeters long. The inflorescence is a webbed umbel of yellow flowers borne on a peduncle up to half a meter tall.

See also
California chaparral and woodlands - ecoregion
California coastal sage and chaparral  - subecoregion	
California montane chaparral and woodlands  - subecoregion

References

External links
Calflora Database: Lomatium lucidum (shiny biscuitroot, shiny lomatium)
Jepson Manual eFlora (TJM2) treatment of Lomatium lucidum
USDA Plants Profile for Lomatium lucidum
Lomatium lucidum - Photo gallery

lucidum
Flora of California
Flora of Baja California
Natural history of the California chaparral and woodlands
Natural history of the Peninsular Ranges
Natural history of the Transverse Ranges
Plants described in 1840